Mbyá Guaraní may be:

Mbayá people
Mbyá Guaraní language

Language and nationality disambiguation pages